Jürgen Karl-Josef Hescheler (born 2 May 1959) is a German physician and stem cell researcher. He is director to the Institute for Neurophysiology and a university professor at the University of Cologne. Prof. Hescheler is one of the most eminent and the most productive stem cell researchers worldwide, averaging more than 1000 citations of his publications per year. Hescheler has been working with embryonic stem cells since the late 80's. He became the first researcher to accomplish an electrophysiological characterisation of stem cells and was also among the first scientists in Germany obtaining permission to do research on human embryonic stem cells. Furthermore, he is founder and chairman to the German Society for Stem Cell Research (GSZ).

Career 
Prof. Hescheler obtained his doctoral degree from Saarland University in 1985 and continued his research on Ca2+ currents until his Habilitation in the year 1988. He was offered C4 Professorship positions at Martin Luther University of Halle-Wittenberg and University of Tübingen in 1993. He was appointed Director of the Institute for Neurophysiology at the University of Cologne in 1994. His subsequent accomplishments include the position of a Visiting Professor at University of Vermont (USA, 1992), at Tongji Medical University, in Wuhan (China, 1998), President of confidants of the German National Academic Foundation (2000), University of Texas, Houston (USA, 2001), University of Xian (China, 2003), Founder and President of the German Society for Stem Cell Research (2004). He has been appointed as the Coordinator of various pan-European consortia including the large-scale integrated EU-projects FunGenES ("Functional Genomics of Engineered Embryonic Stem Cells), CRYSTAL ("Cryo-banking of stem cells for human Therapeutic Application"), ESNATS ("Embryonic stem cell-based Novel Alternative Testing Strategies"), and DETECTIVE - Detection of endpoints and biomarkers for repeated dose toxicity using in vitro systems. In 2009 he was awarded an Honorary Doctorate Dr. h.c. by the Tongji Medical University Wuhan, China.

Hescheler has been working with embryonic stem cells ever since the late 1980s. Beginning with studies on cellular signal transduction, and starting with works on signalling pathways in different cells (g-protein phosphorylation, electrophysiology of channels) he focussed on embryonic stem cells and has since defined many important basic aspects of both fundamental research and clinical applications. He was the first scientist worldwide to perform electrophysiological and functional experiments on stem cells and differentiated phenotypes thereof. He achieved a first functional characterization of cardiomyocytes developed from embryonic stem cells which is an important prerequisite for their subsequent use in regenerative medicine. He thus pioneered the establishment of stem cell research for application in transplantation medicine. In 2002, he was among the first scientists in Germany to obtain permission to work with human embryonic stem cells. In his current position, as Chairman and Director to the Institute for Neurophysiology at the University of Cologne, his research areas include work on embryonic and adult stem cells, induced pluripotent stem cells, mesenchymal stem cells and germline pluripotent stem cells. Among progressing the use of stem cells for translational purposes, aiming at tapping the potential of stem cell biology towards clinical application, Hescheler actively promotes the vision of EPAA through innovative alternative testing strategies, applying stem cells towards toxicity testing. Apart from the rationale of promoting 3R principles it is his goal that coordinating a multidisciplinary research effort undertaken by various projects and consortia led by Hescheler will generate pathway- and evidence-based understanding of long-term toxic effects, thus moving toxicology from a rather descriptive science towards a more mechanistic-driven predictive one. 
 
Hescheler has been appointed coordinator of various European Consortia such as FunGenES, CRYSTAL, and more recently ESNATS and DETECTIVE. He is also coordinator of the BMBF consortium “iPS and adult bone marrow cells for cardiac repair”. In 2004 he founded and since chaired the German Society of Stem Cell Research (GSZ). He is an active member of the Scientific Panel of the AXLR8 Consortium and a member of steering committee of Stem Cell Network North Rhine Westphalia.

Promoting stem cell research on a European scale, he has strong research collaborations inter alia with 

 UK - National Biological Standards Board/UK Stem Cell Bank 
 Switzerland - University of Geneva, Faculty of medicine, ENKAM Pharmaceuticals 
 France - INSERM
 Belgium - Vrije Universiteit Brussel/Department of Toxicology
 Netherlands - University of Maastricht, Academic Medical Centre Amsterdam/Department of Anatomy and Embryology 
 Romania - Institute for Biologic and Cellular Pathologies 
 Portugal - ITQB/IBET
 Hungary - Biotalentum
 Ukraine - National University of Kyiv-Mohyla Academy

And on an International scale with

 Brazil - Universidade de São Paulo
 USA - University of Pittsburgh, Department of pharmacology, Medical University of South Carolina,
 Egypt - Cairo University 
 Cameroon - University of Yaounde, University of Dschang
 China - Huazhong University of Science and Technology, Tongji Medical College, Department of Physiology 
 India - Tulip Bio-med Solutions limited

Awards 

He received several awards for alternative testing research, including the Bundesminister für Jugend, Familie, Frauen und Gesundheit Award (1992), the Hildegard Doerenkamp Gerhard Zbinden Foundation Award (1992), the Dorothy Hegarty Award (1999) and an Honorary Doctorate of the Tongji Medical Faculty of the Huazhong University in Wuhan (China) (2009).

Projects

EU Projects coordinated 

1. DETECTIVE – Detection of endpoints and biomarkers of repeated dose toxicity using in vitro systems

http://www.detect-iv-e.eu/?page_id=319

2. DETECTIVE is a key building block of the SEURAT-1 cluster (Safety Evaluation Ultimately Replacing Animal Testing)

https://web.archive.org/web/20130308083355/http://www.seurat-1.eu/pages/partners-and-people/who-is-who.php

3. Embryonic stem cell-based novel alternative testing strategies

http://www.esnats.eu/index.php/about-esnats/consortium-partners/UKK

4. CRYo-banking of Stem cells for human therapeutic application (completed)

https://web.archive.org/web/20160304064736/http://www.crystal-eu.org/university_of_cologn.html

BMBF projects 

1. Pluripotent Cells for Heart Therapies

http://www.gesundheitsforschung-bmbf.de/en/1195.php#Pluripotent

2. Mesenchymal stem cell mediated preconditioning of human islets

http://www.gesundheitsforschung-bmbf.de/en/1195.php#Mesenchymal

As Partner in EU Projects 

1. diXa: Data Infrastructure for Chemical Safety

http://www.dixa-fp7.eu/home

2. STEMCAM: A IAPP on the Role of NCAM in Stem Cell Differentiation

http://stemcam.biotalentum.eu/partners/ukk

3. INFARCT CELL THERAPY: Therapy after Myocardial Infarction: repair by stem and progenitor cell mobilization and transfer

http://www.meduniwien.ac.at/typo3/index.php?id=6157

4. HYPERLAB High yield and performance stem cell lab

http://www.hyperlab.eu/index.php

References

 https://web.archive.org/web/20140110085854/http://www.uni-koeln.de/med-fak/physiologie/np/index.html 
 https://web.archive.org/web/20131208120533/http://stamm-zell-forschung.com/gsz/

 http://www.stemcells.nrw.de/en/research-careers/research-locations/cologne.html

1959 births
Living people
German medical researchers
Stem cell researchers
Academic staff of the University of Cologne